Walter William Meacham (September 22, 1844 – July 27, 1905) was an Ontario physician and political figure. He represented Lennox in the Legislative Assembly of Ontario from 1886 to 1898 as a Conservative member.

He was born at Colborne, Canada West in 1844, the son of Simon Meacham. His grandfather, Seth Meacham, had also been a doctor and came to Upper Canada from New Hampshire in 1801. Meacham studied medicine at John Rolph's Toronto School of Medicine, graduating in 1869. In 1870, he married Maggie Campbell. He practiced in Odessa.

His uncle James Hubbard Meacham was postmaster at Belleville. He died at Drummer, Peterborough, Ontario in 1905.

References

External links 
The Canadian parliamentary companion, 1897 JA Gemmill

The medical profession in Upper Canada, 1783-1850 ..., W Canniff (1894)

1844 births
1905 deaths
Physicians from Ontario
Progressive Conservative Party of Ontario MPPs